Kenneth Leslie Doubleday (14 February 1926 – 8 June 2014 in Gleelong) is an Australian former hurdler and triple jumper who competed in the 1952 Summer Olympics and in the 1956 Summer Olympics.

References

1931 births
2014 deaths
Australian male hurdlers
Australian male triple jumpers
Olympic athletes of Australia
Athletes (track and field) at the 1952 Summer Olympics
Athletes (track and field) at the 1956 Summer Olympics
Commonwealth Games competitors for Australia
Athletes (track and field) at the 1950 British Empire Games
Athletes (track and field) at the 1954 British Empire and Commonwealth Games
20th-century Australian people
21st-century Australian people